Shamsul Alam may refer to:

 Shamsul Alam (Bir Uttam) (born 1947), Bangladeshi war hero
 Shamsul Alam (economist) (born 1951), Bangladeshi economist
 Shamsul Alam (cricketer), Bangladeshi cricketer
 Shamsul Alam Dudu (born 1957), Bangladesh Awami League politician
 Shamsul Alam Pramanik,  Bangladesh Nationalist Party politician